Pinnacle Peak Pictures (formerly Pure Flix Entertainment) is an American evangelical Christian film production and distribution studio founded by David A. R. White and Russell Wolfe. Pinnacle Peak produces Christian films, including God's Not Dead (2014), Do You Believe? (2015), Woodlawn (2015), The Case for Christ (2017), and Unplanned (2019). Since 2014, films produced and distributed by Pure Flix have collectively grossed over $195 million at the worldwide box office. The company has headquarters in Scottsdale, Arizona.

History 
Pinnacle Peak was founded in 2005 by David A. R. White, Michael Scott, Russell Wolfe, Randy Travis, and Elizabeth Travis as Pure Flix Entertainment

Since its foundation, the company has created many films, such as The Wager, Home Beyond the Sun, In the Blink of an Eye, Sarah's Choice, A Greater Yes: The Story of Amy Newhouse, The Book of Ruth: Journey of Faith, Holyman Undercover, and Samson.

The company produced Jerusalem Countdown in 2011, with 10 West Studios. They also produced the first two seasons of TBN's Travel the Road. God's Not Dead (2014) starring Kevin Sorbo, Shane Harper, and Dean Cain earned over $60 million in the U.S. box office and was released in digital format by Lionsgate on August 5, 2014.

Since late 2015, Pinnacle Peak had its own theatrical distribution arm. In late 2016, Pinnacle Peak announced a homeschooling curriculum for families with home-schooled children and decided to allow their users to delete words such as "hell" and "damn" from their programming. The company has teamed up with the National Hispanic Christian Leadership Conference to supply further opportunities for Hispanic actors to improve the media representation of the Hispanic community.

In 2016, Pinnacle Peak announced that it has struck a long-term multi-year distribution deal with Universal Pictures Home Entertainment, which would officially manage the home media releases of every Pure Flix-produced film, starting with Woodlawn.

On November 12, 2020, Pure Flix announced that its eponymous streaming video service was being acquired by Sony Pictures Entertainment, but that its production arm "Pure Flix Entertainment" is not part of the deal. The deal was complete later that year, with Sony integrating Pure Flix streaming into its Affirm Films banner. In January 2021, Pure Flix announced that following the sale of its eponymous streaming service to Sony, it had rebranded as Pinnacle Peak Pictures.

God's Not Dead series 
Their film God's Not Dead was 2014's highest-grossing independent film and one of the most successful independent faith-based films of all time despite negative criticism. A second film, God's Not Dead 2 grossed over $1.4 million in Brazil and was considered by Vox to be "moderately commercially successful". A third film, titled God's Not Dead 3: A Light in Darkness, was released on March 30, 2018. A fourth film, God's Not Dead: We The People, was released in October 2021. The Christian band Newsboys appear in and provide music for the first two films in the series. Legalities related to the Johnson Amendment were referenced in the second film.

Awards and nominations

Productions and distributions

Film

Television 
 Travel the Road (2003–present)

On-demand service
From 2015 up until 2020, Pinnacle Peak also had an Internet video on demand service simply named Pure Flix. The company was founded by David A. R. White, replacing the streaming platform "I Am Flix". It specializes in Christian streaming media and video-on-demand online. Pure Flix was acquired by Sony Pictures in 2020.

Subsidiaries
Pinnacle Peak owns a subsidiary known as Quality Flix. Quality Flix works with international films, in contrast to Pinnacle Peak, which is primarily focused on distribution of films within the United States.

Controversies 
In 2019, Pure Flix's anti-abortion film Unplanned attracted controversy in both mainstream and evangelical media. Some Christian commentators perceived the film as being unfairly censored after it received an R rating from the Motion Picture Association of America and following a brief and subsequently rescinded suspension of the film's Twitter account. Michael Gryboski, writing for Christian Post, criticized major Canadian film distributors (such as Cineplex) refusal to screen the film in the country, calling it a "de facto ban". Film critic Normal Wilner countered that statement by accusing the distributors of employing disingenuous tactics to "manufacture a controversy", pointing out that the film was eventually shown in about 25 Cineplex and Landmark theaters in Canada and claiming nothing had prevented an earlier release. In turn, he pointed out Pure Flix's decision of deliberately choosing not to screen Unplanned for critics to avoid negative reviews. After its release, some criticized Unplanned for 'dangerous' inaccuracies.

Despite Pure Flix films generally being well-received by its evangelical Christian viewership, the company has also attracted criticism from several Christian commentators. Film critic Alissa Wilkinson, who wrote for Christianity Today and teaches at the Christian King's College in New York City, criticized Pure Flix films for being intellectually unstimulating and reinforcing their audience's prejudices "instead of exercising and challenging the imagination of their audience in ways that would make their audience better Christians". She also criticized the studio's successful God's Not Dead trilogy for being "far more interested in bolstering a certain sort of persecution complex than in encouraging its audience toward Christlike behavior". Justin Chang, another film critic who identifies as Christian, likewise criticized Pure Flix's brand of faith-based films for what he perceived as their "self-victimizing" depiction of the evangelical Christian community. Kayla Bartsch, writing for National Review, argued that Pure Flix's films "work to confirm the hypothesis that American Christianity must be artless and unrefined", making a case for more nuanced and stimulating religious films.

References

External links 
 

2005 establishments in Arizona
American companies established in 2005
American film studios
Christian film production companies
Companies based in Scottsdale, Arizona
Conservative media in the United States
Film production companies of the United States
Homeschooling advocates
Mass media companies established in 2005
Television production companies of the United States
Christianity in popular culture